The Mountain is an American drama television series created by David Barrett, Gina Matthews and Grant Scharbo, that was broadcast on The WB network for one season from September 22, 2004 to January 2, 2005. The show received very low ratings and was canceled after only thirteen episodes.

Plot
The plot centers on a ski resort run by Will Carver (Anson Mount). When his grandfather dies, Will discovers that the resort has been left to his younger brother David (Oliver Hudson), an irresponsible layabout who returns to pick up the reins. There is familial conflict over the resort and over Maria (Alana de la Garza), a woman who previously dated David, but then dates Will. Additional conflict comes from the efforts of land developer Colin Dowling (Mitch Pileggi) and his attractive daughter, Max (Elizabeth Bogush), who falls for David.

Cast and characters

Main
 Oliver Hudson as David Carver Jr.
 Anson Mount as Will Carver
 Tara Thompson as Shelley Carver
 Penn Badgley as Sam Tunney
 Elizabeth Bogush as Max Dowling
 Alana de la Garza as Maria Serrano
 Tommy Dewey as Michael Dowling
 Johann Urb as Travis Thorson
 Mitch Pileggi as Colin Dowling
 Barbara Hershey as Gennie Carver

Recurring
 Kaylee DeFer as Scarlett
 Matt Bellefleur as Fergie
 Sam Easton as Blake
 Brett Cullen as John 'Whit' Whitman
 Martin Cummins as Eric Toth

Guest star
 Chad Everett as David Carver Sr. (episode: Pilot)

Episodes

References

External links
 
 

The WB original programming
2004 American television series debuts
2005 American television series endings
2000s American drama television series
English-language television shows
Television series by Warner Bros. Television Studios
Television series by Wonderland Sound and Vision
Television shows filmed in Vancouver
Television shows set in Colorado